Pensacola: Wings of Gold is a syndicated American action/adventure drama series based at the Naval Air Station Pensacola in Pensacola, Florida. Episodes were aired in several countries outside the U.S. including Portugal, France, Sweden, South Africa, Finland, Estonia, The Netherlands, Germany, Italy, Hungary, Romania, Australia and Sri Lanka. Although set in Florida, it was largely filmed in San Diego particularly at Marine Corps Air Station Miramar (MCAS Miramar).  Cast members in season 2 were part of a squadron mimicking VMFAT-101, the F/A-18 instructor squadron based in Miramar.  Outdoor scenes were filmed in San Diego and MCAS Miramar while indoor scenes were filmed at Stu Segall Studios in San Diego.

Cast
James Brolin as Lt. Col. Bill "Raider" Kelly, commanding officer of VMFAT-107, an F/A-18 Hornet training squadron

Season 1
Kristanna Loken as Janine Kelly, Lt. Col. Kelly's daughter
Kathryn Morris as Lieutenant Annalisa "Stinger" Lindstrom, UH-1 helicopter aviator
Rodney Rowland as Lieutenant Bobby "Chaser" Griffin, F/A-18 Hornet aviator
Rodney Van Johnson as Lieutenant Wendell "Cipher" McCray, Force Recon
Salvator Xuereb as Lieutenant A.J. "Buddha" Conaway, demolitions expert
Brynn Thayer as Colonel Rebecca Hodges, LtCol. Kelly's superior officer

Season 2
Bobby Hosea as Maj. MacArthur "Hammer" Lewis, Jr., executive officer (XO) of VMFAT-107; F/A-18 Hornet instructor pilot
Michael Trucco as Lt. Tucker "Spoon" Henry III,  F/A-18 Hornet student aviator
Sandra Hess as Lt. Alexandra "Ice" Jensen,  F/A-18 Hornet student aviator
Kenny Johnson as Lieutenant Butch "Burner" Barnes, F/A-18 Hornet student aviator
Barbara Niven as Kate Anderson, barkeep

Season 3
All main cast reprised their role from season 2
Felicity Waterman as Captain Abigail "Mad Dog" Holley, a helicopter pilot on loan from the Royal Air Force and squadron's boxing coach
David Quane as Captain Edward "Capone" Terrelli, pilot of the AH-1W "Cobra" gunship, a former fighter pilot

Episodes

Season 1 (1997–98)

Season 2 (1998–99)

Season 3 (1999–2000)

DVD releases
FilmRise has released all 3 seasons on DVD.

Awards and nominations

Video Games
In June/July 1997, Bethesda Softworks announced a partnership with CBS Enterprises to produce the first-ever true companion PC series of games for the series. By December 1997, the first CD-ROM game was still in production.

References

External links
 
 

1990s American drama television series
2000s American drama television series
1997 American television series debuts
2000 American television series endings
First-run syndicated television programs in the United States
English-language television shows
Television series by CBS Studios
Television shows set in Florida
Aviation television series
American military television series